Francisco Javier "Maza" Rodríguez Pineda (born 20 October 1981) is a Mexican former professional footballer who played as a centre-back.

Club career

Guadalajara
Francisco Javier Rodríguez was born in Mazatlán, Sinaloa, which is the origin of his nickname "Maza" (short for Mazatlán). He began his professional career with Guadalajara under Dutch manager Hans Westerhof, debuting for the club in the Apertura 2002 tournament.

In the Apertura 2006, Rodríguez had a pivotal role in Guadalajara's championship run, winning the final second-leg match 2–1 (3–2 on aggregate) against Toluca on 10 December. The win gave Chivas their eleventh league championship, a record which stood until América matched it in 2013.

PSV Eindhoven

On 9 May 2008, it was announced that he was transferred for US$1.8 million to Dutch club PSV Eindhoven, the second Mexican in the latter squad with Carlos Salcido. Rodríguez was predominantly during that debut season mostly on the bench, and proved an alternate centre backs for Dirk Marcellis. He scored his first goal with the Dutch giants on 25 November 2008 with a 30-yard shot against Heracles Almelo.

Prior to the start of the 2009–10 season, Rodríguez was given the number four jersey, previously worn by Manuel da Costa, who had transferred to Fiorentina in January 2008. He won a starting spot in the center of defence for both the Eredevisie and the Europa League.

VfB Stuttgart
On 14 July 2011, Rodríguez signed a three-year contract with VfB Stuttgart for an undisclosed fee. Rodríguez made his Bundesliga debut on 6 August 2011 in a 3–0 win against Schalke 04. He registered an assist in the 37th minute to Cacau, which gave Stuttgart a 2–0 lead in their 3–0 victory.

América
On 2 January 2013, Rodríguez was transferred to América. When América defeated Cruz Azul in the Clausura 2013 final, he became the first player in history to win a league championship with both América and Chivas, archrivals in Mexico's biggest rivalry, El Súper Clásico. He had previously won the league title with Chivas in the Apertura 2006.

Cruz Azul
On 4 June 2014, Rodríguez was transferred to Cruz Azul.

Lobos BUAP
After six seasons with Cruz Azul, Rodríguez was transferred to newly promoted Lobos BUAP for the Apertura 2017.

International career

Youth
Rodríguez was part of the Mexico 2004 Olympic under-23 team. They were eliminated in the group stage, having finished third in Group A, below group winners Mali and South Korea.

Senior
Rodríguez made his debut with the senior national team on 18 February 2004 in a friendly against Chile in Carson, California. He scored his first goal for Mexico on 8 July 2005 in a 1–2 CONCACAF Gold Cup loss against South Africa.

On 2 April 2006, he was called up by coach Ricardo La Volpe for the 2006 FIFA World Cup. Rodríguez played in the match against Portugal.

Rodríguez was a part of the Mexico squad in the 2010 FIFA World Cup in South Africa. He was a starter in all of Mexico's group matches, and played the Round of 16 match against Argentina.

During the 2011 CONCACAF Gold Cup, Rodríguez, and four other members of the Mexico national team, tested positive for the banned substance of Clenbuterol and were withdrawn from the tournament squad. However, all players were exonerated as FIFA determined that the accused had ingested the banned substance via contaminated meat that had been served during a pre-tournament training camp. However, World Anti-Doping Agency appealed to the Court of Arbitration for Sport to request a ban. But on 12 October 2011, WADA withdrew this request after the full file was made available to them.

Rodríguez also participated at the 2014 FIFA World Cup.

Career statistics

Club
Updated 26 May 2013

International

International goals

Honours
Guadalajara
Primera División: Apertura 2006

PSV
Johan Cruyff Shield: 2008

América
Liga MX: Clausura 2013

Mexico U23
CONCACAF Olympic Qualifying Championship: 2004

Mexico
CONCACAF Gold Cup: 2015

See also
 List of men's footballers with 100 or more international caps

References

External links
 
 
 
 
 

1981 births
Living people
Sportspeople from Mazatlán
Footballers from Sinaloa
Mexican expatriate footballers
Mexican footballers
Association football defenders
Mexico international footballers
Footballers at the 2004 Summer Olympics
Olympic footballers of Mexico
2005 CONCACAF Gold Cup players
2006 FIFA World Cup players
2007 CONCACAF Gold Cup players
2007 Copa América players
2010 FIFA World Cup players
2011 CONCACAF Gold Cup players
2013 FIFA Confederations Cup players
2014 FIFA World Cup players
2015 CONCACAF Gold Cup players
CONCACAF Gold Cup-winning players
Liga MX players
C.D. Guadalajara footballers
Expatriate footballers in the Netherlands
Eredivisie players
PSV Eindhoven players
Mexican expatriate sportspeople in the Netherlands
VfB Stuttgart players
Club América footballers
Expatriate footballers in Germany
Bundesliga players
Mexican expatriate sportspeople in Germany
FIFA Century Club